Howard Rasmus Brinker (October 20, 1893 - May 19, 1965) was the fifth bishop of Nebraska in The Episcopal Church.

Early life and education
Brinker was born on October 20, 1893, in Nashotah, Wisconsin, to Henry Brinker and Anna Margaret Rasmus. He was educated at the University of Pennsylvania, and then at the Philadelphia Divinity School, from where he graduated in 1918. Nashotah House awarded him a Doctor of Divinity on May 17, 1940, while the Philadelphia Divinity School awarded him a Doctor of Sacred Theology on June 6, 1940.

Ordained Ministry
Brinker was ordained deacon on June 23, 1918, and priest on April 14, 1919, by the Bishop of Wyoming Nathaniel S. Thomas. He served as rector of Christ Church in Douglas, Wyoming between 1918 and 1923, and then rector of St Bartholomew's Church in Chicago between 1923 and 1940.

Episcopacy
On October 18, 1939, Brinker was elected Bishop of Nebraska, and was consecrated on January 25, 1940, at Trinity Cathedral in Omaha, Nebraska. During his episcopacy, in 1946, the Diocese of Western Nebraska was reunited with the Diocese of Nebraska. He retired in 1962.

Family
Brinker married Winifred Eleanor Parsons on July 29, 1934, and together had a daughter Mary Anna, and a son Howard Rasmus Jr. Their son died at the age of two in 1944.

References 

1893 births
1965 deaths
20th-century American Episcopalians
University of Pennsylvania alumni
Episcopal bishops of Nebraska
20th-century American clergy